Le Grand Cirque is a 1950 French war film directed by Georges Péclet. It is based on the memoir of the same name by Pierre Clostermann.

Plot 
Pierre Despont is seconded to a Free French squadron flying with the RAF at Biggin Hill Aerodrome, under the command of René Mouchotte. The fearless Despont becomes close friends with fellow pilots Jean Loessig and Jacques Desmarets, but the squadron's dangerous reconnaissance and combat missions in Spitfire Mk. IX fighters take their toll on the pilots. Loessig goes missing over Normandy during the D-Day landings while Desmarets is killed on the final day of combat in Europe, leaving his wife a widow. Despont survives the war but is left melancholy by the loss of his friends.

Cast 
Pamela Skiff as Patricia
Pierre Cressoy as Pierre Despont
Jean Barrère as Jacques Desmarets
Jean Christian as Captain Mouchotte
Roger Saltel as Jean Loessig
Édouard Delmont as Peasant
Pierre Larquey as the priest
Alexandre Dundas
Alain Terrane
Manuel Gary as Mechanic
Jean Ozenne
Jean Vilmont
Anne Laurens as Sybil
Jacques Roux as an aviator
Jacques Marbeuf
André Chanu

Release 
The film was a moderate success, taking $3,043,781 at the French box office.

References

External links 
 

1950 war films
1950 films
World War II films
1950s French-language films
1950s French films